The Coalition of the Willing is an instrumental jazz and rock "all-star" ensemble led by Bobby Previte. Live performances are improvisational emphasizing groove, experimental and cross-genres. The self-titled album was released 2006 (Ropeadope) and the tour began in early 2006. The West Coast touring band has remained active through July 2007.

Album Musician Credits
 Bobby Previte - Drums & Percussion
 Charlie Hunter - Electric Guitars, Electric Basses
 Steven Bernstein - Trumpet, Slide Trumpet
 Jamie Saft - Organ, Mellotron, Moog, Electric Guitars, Electric Basses
 Skerik - Tenor and Baritone Saxophones
 Stanton Moore - Drums
 Stew Cutler - Harmonica, Slide Guitar

European Touring Band - Winter/Spring 2006
 Bobby Previte: drums
 Charlie Hunter: guitar
 Steven Bernstein: trumpet, slide trumpet
 Marco Benevento: organ, electric piano, electronics

USA Touring Band - Fall 2006
 Charlie Hunter - Skerik - Robert Walter - Bobby Previte

USA Touring Band - Winter 2007
 THE SEPARATION: Marco Benevento - Reed Mathis - Bobby Previte This performance was a collaboration with playwright/director Andrea Kleine, the early music choir "The Rose Ensemble" and visual artist Anna Kiraly. It was co-commitioned by and premiered at The Walker Art Center in Minneapolis, Minnesota February 2, 2007.
 WEST COAST TOUR: Reed Mathis - Brian Coogan - Skerik - Bobby Previte

See also
 The Coalition of the Willing (album)

References

External links
 Official Site
 Cerebral Rock with Bobby Previte Interview by Robyn Rubinstein at Jambase.com, August 3, 2006.

American instrumental musical groups
Jazz fusion ensembles
American jazz-rock groups
American rock music groups